Nancey is a surname and a given name.

People with given name
 Nancey Harrington, U.S. politician
 Nancey Jackson Johnson (born 1968), U.S. musician
 Nancey Murphy (born 1951), U.S. philosopher
 Nancey Silvers, U.S. screenwriter and sister of Cathy Silvers

People with surname
 Marcel Nancey, French journalist and dramatist
 Nicolas Nancey (1874–1925), French dramatist

See also

 
 Nance (disambiguation)
 Nanci, a given name
 Nancy (disambiguation)
 Mancey

Given names originating from a surname